Eros International Media Ltd (also known as Eros India) is an Indian motion picture production and distribution company, based and originated in Mumbai, India. Founded by Arjan Lulla in 1977, it is one of the leading production and distribution companies in India. Currently, his sons Kishore Lulla and Sunil Lulla manage the company. It is a subsidiary of Eros Media World, formed in 2020.

Eros co-produces, acquires and distributes Indian films in multiple formats worldwide, including theatrical, television syndication and digital platforms.
Eros has over 12,000 films in its library which include Hindi, Tamil, Telugu and other regional language films.

History

In 1977, Arjan Lulla started the company. In 1981, he founded the company Jupitar Enterprise with Mr. Kishore Lulla and Ms. Bhagibhai Lulla. On 19 August 1994 Rishima International Pvt Ltd was founded. It was a private limited company. Through its subsidiary "Eros International Films", the company produced and distributed films. On 1 April 1999, the company acquired the entire Jupiter Enterprise. Their first jointly produced film was Waqt (2005). On 25 July 2000, the name was changed to Eros Multimedia Private Limited. The name was again changed to Eros International Pvt Ltd on 20 November 2008. On 16 September 2009, the company was converted into a public limited company and on 18 November, the name was changed to the present name Eros International Media Ltd. In 2010, Eros International Media Limited was listed on the Bombay Stock Exchange (BSE) and National Stock Exchange (NSE) in India. The name Eros was chosen after the Greek god of love.

Subsidiaries

Current
 Colour Yellow Productions Pvt Ltd (50% share)
 Copsale Limited
 Digicine Pte Ltd
 Eros Animation Pvt Ltd
 Eros International Films
 Eros International Distribution LLP (99.8% share)
 Eros Music Publishing Limited
 Eyeqube Studios Pvt Limited (99.9% share)
 Techzone 56060

Former
Ayngaran International (51% share)
HBO Hits (India) (50% share)

Joint Ventures
Reliance Eros Productions LLP (joint Venture with Reliance Industries)

Partnerships
In 2008, Eros International made a deal with Universal Music Group to make a joint-venture to promote pop music to India. The agreement was announced by Kishore Lulla and Max Hole, President of Universal Music Asia Pacific Region and Executive Vice President, Universal Music Group International (UMGI) on 10 December though the joint venture was officiated with a contractual signing on 18 November. Rajat Kakar, Managing Director of Universal Music India was appointed as the chairperson and Sunil Lulla and Jyoti Deshpande, former COO of Eros International Group, are on the board of directors. That same year, the company formed a joint venture with Lionsgate. The two companies would also co-produce films with budgets ranging from $10 to 20 million. Eros and Lionsgate also received access to each other's library, with Eros planning to air Lionsgate's TV shows such as Weeds and Mad Men and Lionsgate distributing some of Eros' Hindi films in North America such as Om Shanti Om, Gandhi, My Father and Eklavya: The Royal Guard.

Filmography

Films produced and distributed by Eros International

Film music and soundtrack produced by Eros Music

Awards

See also
Eros Now
List of film production companies in India

References

External links

Hindi cinema
Mass media companies established in 1977
Film production companies based in Mumbai
Companies listed on the New York Stock Exchange
Indian companies established in 1977
Reliance Media
Companies listed on the National Stock Exchange of India
Companies listed on the Bombay Stock Exchange